Hare Krishna views of homosexuality, and especially the view of the International Society for Krishna Consciousness (ISKCON) towards LGBT issues, are similar to their views of heterosexual relationships, i.e. because the living entity is identifying with the body, any attraction based on the desire to gratify the body and its senses is symptomatic of illusion and can be purified by progressively elevating the consciousness. Put simply, both hetero- and homosexual attraction is due to an illusory attachment to the temporary body. Same-sex relations and gender variance have been represented within Hinduism from Vedic times through to the present day, in rituals, law books, mythical narratives, commentaries, paintings, and sculpture. The extent to which these representations embrace or reject homosexuality has been disputed within the religion as well as outside of it.

The Hare Krishna movement, as a distinct Hindu sect, and especially ISKCON, generally view all sex and sexuality (except procreational sex within the context of marriage) as being "illicit" with another partner.  The focus of one's life is supposed to be geared towards spirituality and not sexuality.  Nevertheless, there have been a number of LGBT people involved in the Hare Krishna movement over the years.

According to the accounts of his disciples, the founder of the International Society for Krishna Consciousness, A. C. Bhaktivedanta Swami Prabhupada didn't discriminate on the base of sexual orientation - however, he condemned homosexual sex on the strength of the argument that although all sexuality is the root of bondage in the material world, heterosexual sex can at least be spiritualized by having children and raising them in Krishna consciousness; which is not possible through homosexual sexual activity. In Prabhupada's own words, from the conversation he had with one of his disciples, Govinda Dasi, "The sex life between man and woman can be sanctified by marriage. That is the difference. Krsna says in the Gita that I am the sex life within marriage. So within marriage it can be used for having nice Krsna conscious children but not like this. This is very low class." Furthermore, it says in Prabhupada's commentary on Srimad Bhagavatam 3.20.26, "In other words, the homosexual appetite of a man for another man is demoniac and is not for any sane male in the ordinary course of life."

Hare Krishna movement in the 1960s

When A. C. Bhaktivedanta Swami Prabhupada came to New York City in the 1960s to start his religious movement, he was met by hippies and beatniks such as Allen Ginsberg, Howard Wheeler and Keith Ham, who took an interest in his Krishna-based religion and spirituality.

Allen Ginsberg was involved with Krishnaism, and had been chanting the Hare Krishna mantra since he first visited India in 1963.  He befriended Swami Prabhupada, a relationship that is documented by Satsvarupa dasa Goswami in his biographical account Srila Prabhupada Lilamrta. Ginsberg donated money, materials, and his reputation to help the Swami establish the first temple, and toured with him to promote his cause. Ginsberg also claimed to be the first person on the North American continent to chant the Hare Krishna mantra. Music and chanting were both important parts of Ginsberg's live delivery during poetry readings.  He often accompanied himself on a harmonium, and was often accompanied by a guitarist.  When Ginsberg asked if he could sing a song in praise of Lord Krishna on William F. Buckley, Jr.'s TV show "Firing Line" on September 3, 1968, Buckley acceded and the poet chanted slowly as he played dolefully on a harmonium.  According to Richard Brookhiser, an associate of Buckley's, the host commented that it was "the most unharried Krishna I've ever heard."  Ginsberg spoke with Swami Prabhupada on many occasions and discussed the importance that the mantra and Krishna Consciousness can have on the world.

Howard Wheeler and Keith Ham were two early followers of Swami Prabhupada.  Howard and Keith met at the University of North Carolina at Chapel Hill, became lovers, and then moved to New York.  In New York City, they met Swami Prabhupada, began following him, and went on to play prominent roles in the Hare Krishna movement.  Keith Ham became Kirtanananda Swami, and Howard Wheeler became Hayagriva Swami.  After becoming involved in the Hare Krishna movement, Kirtanananda became "celibate" (though later was caught breaking his vows), and Hayagriva was married by Prabhupada to Shyama Dasi.  The marriage lasted eleven years, and later he was married to Purnamasi Dasi. Nevertheless, the book Monkey On A Stick (by John Hubner and Lindsey Gruson, 1988 and 1990) suggests that Hayagriva was likely seeing men throughout those years too. Hayagriva died of cancer in 1989. Kirtanananda Swami, on the other hand, was supposed to be "celibate", but was eventually caught being intimate with a boy in 1993.  This was the final incident that basically resulted in Kirtanananda being removed from the New Vrindaban Community that he and Hayagriva founded.  Kirtanananda, in recent years, has left the United States. Keith Ham died on October 24, 2011, at a hospital in Thane, near Mumbai, India with reasons being quoted as Kidney Failure.

Contemporary
Musician Boy George was openly involved with the Hare Krishna movement, members of ISKCON have appeared in several of his stage performances, and his 1991 song "Bow Down Mister", recorded by his band Jesus Loves You, includes the Hare Krishna mantra and other references to the Hare Krishnas.  Regarding homosexuality and the Hare Krishna movement, George says in his book Take It Like a Man, "A swami, who I was very fond of, told me it was harder for homosexuals to enter the gates of heaven. I replied, 'especially if you keep them shut. George also wrote, "Some devotees are obviously uncomfortable with my association with Krishna Consciousness. Others treat me with utmost respect and kindness."

Other Hindu views and traditions regarding Krishna and LGBT issues

Hindu religious narratives
In the Hindu tradition, in the Upanishada and sacred texts, Brahmacharya (austere celibacy in mind, word, and deed) is described and extolled. Further, it is held as the prerequisite for the spiritual progress of a human being (CIF Brahmacharya, Gettha Press, Gorakhpur). Sublimation of sexuality and observance of celibacy are mandated even for married couples for spiritual progress.

The Sakhi-Bekhi
The sakhi-bekhis are prominent throughout Bengal, Bihar, Orissa and Uttar Pradesh although their numbers have diminished in recent years. Members of this sect typically dress themselves as women in order to reinforce their identity as sakhis or girlfriends of Krishna and to attain the esteemed spiritual emotion known as sakhi-bhava. Such men are not always transgender or homosexual but in many cases they are. In modern times, the sakhi-bekhi sect was condemned as sahajiya (unauthentic) when some members began making public shows of their romantic feelings for Krishna while at the same time having illicit relations with cudadharis (men dressed up as Krishna with a crown of peacock feathers). Nowadays, most sakhi-bekhis crossdress in private and are less conspicuous. They generally worship Sri Radha, the consort of Lord Krishna, although some specifically worship Lord Caitanya (the incarnation of Radha and Krishna combined) and are known as gauranga-nagaris. Neither group practices castration.

See also 
 Homosexuality in India
 LGBT issues and Hinduism

References

External links 
 The Gay and Lesbian Vaishnava Association - Information and support for GLBTI Vaishnavas and Hindus.
 Pink Pages, India's National Gay and Lesbian Magazine - Interview of Amara Das Wilhelm, founder of GALVA.

Hare Krishna movement
International Society for Krishna Consciousness